Jack Sheppard was a British criminal.

Jack Sheppard may also refer to:

Jack Sheppard (cave diver)
Jack Sheppard (cricketer)
Jack Sheppard (novel), 1839

See also
Jack Shepherd (disambiguation)